"My Old Dutch" may refer to:
"My Old Dutch" (song), an 1892 song by Albert Chevalier
My Old Dutch (1915 film), a film starring Albert Chevalier and Florence Turner
My Old Dutch (1926 film), a film starring May McAvoy and Pat O'Malley
My Old Dutch (1934 film), a film starring Betty Balfour and Gordon Harker